Bert L. Vallee (1919-2010) was an Edgar M. Bronfman Distinguished Senior Professor at the Harvard Medical School. He was the founder and president of the Endowment and the CBBSM (Center for Biochemical & Biophysical Sciences & Medicine).

Early life and career
Vallee received his M.D degree from New York University in 1943 and subsequently held positions at Massachusetts Institute of Technology and Harvard Medical School in Medicine and Biochemistry. Vallee was a member of the Medical and Science Faculty of Harvard University since 1948. He was the Founding Director of the Biophysics Research Laboratory at Harvard (predecessor to the CBBSM), which was established in 1954 by The Rockefeller Foundation. From 1964 to 1989, Vallee held the Paul C. Cabot Professorship of Biochemistry, and since 1980 he held the Edgar M. Bronfman Distinguished Senior Professorship at Harvard.

Research 
His primary research was in zinc enzymology, a field he is credited with establishing and for which he received the Raulin Award. His work on alcohol dehydrogenase, a zinc enzyme, led to his interest in the study of the molecular basis of alcohol use and abuse. Dr. Vallee was an expert on emission spectroscopy and the author of more than 600 scientific publications including books.

He was an Honorary Professor of Tsinghua University, Beijing, China, the Shanghai Institute of Biochemistry, the Chinese Academy of Sciences, Shanghai, China, and the Stellenbosch University, Stellenbosch, South Africa. He was a member of the National Academy of Sciences of the US and of the Royal Danish Academy of Science and Letters. He held Honorary Degrees from the Karolinska Institute, Stockholm, the University Degli Studi Di Napoli Federico II, Naples, and the Ludwig Maximilian University, Munich.

Awards and recognitions 
He was awarded the Order of Andres Bello, First Class of the Republic of Venezuela, and the Gibbs, Linderstrom-Lang, and Rose Medals.

The Bert L. & N. Kuggie Vallee Foundation
The Bert L. and N. Kuggie Vallee Foundation was established in 1996 by Bert L and N. Kuggie Vallee to promote a collegial community of international scientists, to enhance scientific collaboration and communication, and to advance medical education and biomedical research.

In its initial years, the Foundation's mission to promote dialogue between active and prominent biomedical scientists around the world was achieved by sponsoring visiting professorships at institutions with which Bert Vallee had developed close collaborations and by organizing biennial meetings of this group of biomedical scientists.  More recently, the programs have grown and include scientists worldwide.

The Foundation's programs include:
 Month-long Vallee Visiting Professorships, which pair senior scientists with premier biomedical research institutes worldwide
 Young Investigator Awards providing funding for junior faculty carrying out basic biomedical research
 The Bert and Natalie Vallee Award in Biomedical Science to recognize international achievements in the sciences basic to medicine
 Vallee Fellowships to the Lindau Nobel Laureate Meetings for gifted young post-docs 
 Symposia and meetings for Vallee Visiting Professors and Young Investigators to interact in a collegial environment, report on their scientific interests, and address current issues in biomedical science.

References

External links 
 Michael Gottesman: Purely Academic Interview with Michael Gottesman who studied at Vallee's laboratory.
 http://news.harvard.edu/gazette/story/2013/06/bert-lester-vallee/ Memorial Minute - Harvard Medical School
 http://www.asbmb.org/asbmbtoday/asbmbtoday_article.aspx?id=8688 ASBMB Today, August 2010
 http://www.thevalleefoundation.org The Bert L. and N Kuggie Vallee Foundation, Inc.
 S. James Adelstein and James F. Riordan, "Bert L. Vallee", Biographical Memoirs of the National Academy of Sciences (2014)

1919 births
New York University alumni
Massachusetts Institute of Technology faculty
Harvard Medical School faculty
American medical researchers
2010 deaths